Birmingham Ladywood is a constituency of part of the city of Birmingham, represented in the House of Commons since 2010 by Shabana Mahmood of the Labour Party.

Members of Parliament 

Clare Short, elected as a Labour MP from the 1983 general election onwards, resigned the Labour whip on 20 October 2006 and wished it to be known that she would continue to sit in the Commons as an independent MP.

Constituency profile
Birmingham Ladywood includes Birmingham City Centre along with the areas of Aston, Ladywood, Nechells and Soho. The area is one of the most multicultural in Birmingham and the whole of the United Kingdom; in the 1991 census, 55.6% of the constituency population were ethnic minorities, the highest in England at the time. In the recession of 2008–09, it was the first place in the UK where the unemployment claimant count rate exceeded 10%, breaching that level in January 2009. In July 2008, Ladywood had the highest unemployment rate in the whole of the West Midlands (by the international standardised measure, which is usually higher than the claimant count) at just over 18%, compared with neighbouring Birmingham seats Perry Barr (8.1%), Sparkbrook and Small Heath (13.9%), and Yardley (7%). For the year ending September 2014, the unemployment rate was 12.4%, although the employment rate had increased only slightly, from 46.1% to 46.6% (compared with 69.7% for the West Midlands as a whole).

The average house price in Ladywood is just under £155,000; making it much lower than the national average of just over £288,000.

Boundaries 

2010–present: As 1997 but with redrawn boundaries.

1997–2010: The City of Birmingham wards of Aston, Ladywood, Nechells, and Soho.

1983–1997: The City of Birmingham wards of Ladywood, Sandwell, and Soho.

1974–1983: The County Borough of Birmingham wards of All Saints', Ladywood, Rotton Park, and Soho.

1955–1974: The County Borough of Birmingham wards of Duddeston, Ladywood, and St Paul's.

1950–1955: The County Borough of Birmingham wards of All Saints', Ladywood, and Rotton Park.

1918–1950: The County Borough of Birmingham wards of Ladywood and Rotton Park.

The constituency includes the entirety of Birmingham City Centre (Ladywood ward), as well as Aston, Nechells and Soho which (based on the indices of Multiple Deprivation) are the city wards of highest deprivation. Aston University is within the seat, as are Birmingham's two league football clubs, Aston Villa and Birmingham City.

History 
Summary of results
The constituency has undergone several boundary changes since its creation in 1918 but has remained a safe Labour seat since the Second World War, with the exception of a by-election in 1969 when Wallace Lawler won the seat for the Liberal Party and the immediately surrounding period when its majority was marginal. The seat was regained for Labour by Doris Fisher at the 1970 general election. The 2015 general election result made the seat the sixth-safest of Labour's 232 seats by percentage of majority.

Notable representatives
The constituency's first MP was the future Conservative Prime Minister Neville Chamberlain, who transferred to the Edgbaston seat in 1929. The current MP is Shabana Mahmood, one of the UK's first three female Muslim MPs.

The first campaign for this constituency in 1918 was notable because the Liberal Party candidate was Mrs Margery Corbett Ashby, one of only seventeen women candidates to contest a parliamentary election at the first opportunity. Chamberlain reacted to this intervention by being one of the few male candidates to specifically target women voters; deploying his wife, issuing a special leaflet headed "A word to the Ladies" and holding two meetings in the afternoon.

Elections

Elections in the 2010s

Elections in the 2000s

Elections in the 1990s

Elections in the 1980s

Elections in the 1970s

Elections in the 1960s

Elections in the 1950s

Elections in the 1940s

Elections in the 1930s

Elections in the 1920s

Elections in the 1910s

See also 
List of parliamentary constituencies in the West Midlands (county)

Notes

References

External links 
 Birmingham city council constituency page

Parliamentary constituencies in Birmingham, West Midlands
Constituencies of the Parliament of the United Kingdom established in 1918
Ladywood